Mir Azizi (also Romanized as Mīr ‘Azīzī; also known as Mirazi) is a village in Hojr Rural District, in the Central District of Sahneh County, Kermanshah Province, Iran. At the 2006 census, its population was 354, in 94 families.

References 

Populated places in Sahneh County